The 1982 FIBA Europe Under-18 Championship was an international basketball  competition held in Bulgaria in 1982.

Final ranking

Awards

External links
FIBA Archive

FIBA U18 European Championship
1982–83 in European basketball
1982 in Bulgarian sport
International youth basketball competitions hosted by Bulgaria